The 2007 Sudan Premier League was the 36th edition of the highest club level football competition in Sudan.

Final standings

Goal scorers 

Sudan Premier League seasons
Sudan
Sudan
football